Lee Leslie Hodges (born 4 September 1973) is an English football player and manager who plays for Plymouth Marjon in the South West Peninsula League. He made four appearances in the Premier League for Tottenham Hotspur and 394 appearances in the Football League for Plymouth Argyle, Wycombe Wanderers, Barnet, Reading and Torquay United. A versatile player, Hodges is capable of playing in defence, midfield and attack. 
He spent five years as the player-manager of Conference South club Truro City across two spells, first from 2010 to 2013 and again from 2016 to 2018.

Playing career
He previously played for Tottenham Hotspur during which he had loan spells with Plymouth Argyle and Wycombe Wanderers. He joined Barnet in 1994 where he spent three seasons, scoring 26 goals in 104 league appearances. He moved to Reading in 1997 where he made 70 league appearances before moving to Plymouth in 2001. It was announced in April 2008 that Hodges, along with five other Plymouth players, were going to be released when their contracts expired in June. He then went on to sign for Torquay United in the Conference National. On 9 October 2009, Hodges joined Truro City on a three-month loan. He was released by Torquay on 15 May 2010 along with six other players.

In September 2020, aged 47, Hodges came out of retirement to join Plymouth Marjon of the South West Peninsula League. He made his league debut for the club eleven months later in a 6–0 defeat at Brixham.

Managerial career
On 14 June 2010, after a caretaker spell as manager of Truro City, he was appointed Truro's new manager on a one-year contract. He signed a two-year extension to his contract in June 2011 after winning the Southern League Premier Division championship and promotion to Conference South. After guiding the cash-strapped club through the 2012–13 season, during which the club nearly went out of business, Hodges was not offered a new contract for the following season for financial reasons.

After rejoining Truro in 2016, Hodges later resigned from the club in August 2018, after just two games into the new season.

Honours

Player
Plymouth Argyle
Football League Third Division winner: 2001–02
Football League Second Division winner: 2003–04

Torquay United
Conference National play-off winner: 2008–09

Manager
Truro City
Southern League Premier Division winner: 2010–11

Career statistics
(correct as of 7 May 2007)

References

External links

1973 births
Living people
People from Epping
English footballers
Tottenham Hotspur F.C. players
Plymouth Argyle F.C. players
Wycombe Wanderers F.C. players
Barnet F.C. players
Reading F.C. players
Torquay United F.C. players
Truro City F.C. players
Truro City F.C. managers
Premier League players
English Football League players
English football managers
National League (English football) managers
Association football midfielders